Jownush (also Romanized as Jownūsh; also known as Jonūsh) is a village in Farmahin Rural District, in the Central District of Farahan County, Markazi Province, Iran. At the 2006 census, its population was 216, in 63 families.

References 

Populated places in Farahan County